Transilien Paris-Saint-Lazare is one of the sectors in the Paris Transilien suburban rail network. The trains on this sector depart from Gare Saint-Lazare in central Paris and serve the north and north-west of Île-de-France region with Transilien lines "J" and "L". Transilien services from Paris – Saint-Lazare are part of the SNCF Saint-Lazare rail network.

The two lines are the busiest lines in the Transilien system, excluding lines signed as part of the RER.

Line J

The trains on Line J travel between Gare Saint-Lazare in Paris and the north-west of Île-de-France region, with termini in Ermont–Eaubonne, Gisors and Vernon. The line has a total of 2600,000 passengers per weekday.

List of Line J stations

Gisors Branch
Paris-Saint-Lazare
Asnières-sur-Seine station
Bois-Colombes station
Colombes station
Le Stade station
Argenteuil station
Val d'Argenteuil station
Cormeilles-en-Parisis station
La Frette–Montigny station
Herblay station
Conflans-Sainte-Honorine station
Éragny–Neuville station
Saint-Ouen-l'Aumône-Quartier de l'Église station
Pontoise station
Osny station
Boissy-l'Aillerie station
Montgeroult–Courcelles station
Us station
Santeuil–Le Perchay station
Chars station
Lavilletertre station
Liancourt-Saint-Pierre station
Chaumont-en-Vexin station
Trie-Château station
Gisors station

Ermont Branch
same route as the Gisors line between Paris-Saint-Lazare and Argenteuil
Sannois station
Ermont–Eaubonne station

Mantes Branch
same route as the Gisors line between Paris-Saint-Lazare and Conflans-Sainte-Honorine
Conflans-Fin-d'Oise station
Maurecourt station
Andrésy station
Chanteloup-les-Vignes station
Triel-sur-Seine station
Vaux-sur-Seine station
Thun-le-Paradis station
Meulan–Hardricourt station
Juziers station
Gargenville station
Issou–Porcheville station
Limay station
Mantes-Station station
Mantes-la-Jolie station

Poissy-Vernon Branch
Paris-Saint-Lazare
Houilles–Carrières-sur-Seine station
Poissy station
Villennes-sur-Seine station
Vernouillet–Verneuil station
Les Clairières de Verneuil station
Les Mureaux station
Aubergenville-Élisabethville station
Épône–Mézières station
Mantes-Station station
Mantes-la-Jolie station
Rosny-sur-Seine station
Bonnières station
Vernon–Giverny station

Services
Line J utilises four-letter codes, called a mission code or the name of service. The four-letter code begins with a letter that designates the terminus of the station.

The first letter designates the train's destination.
 A: Argenteuil
 C: Conflans Sainte-Honorine
 E: Ermont-Eaubonne
 G: Gisors
 H: Houilles Carrières-sur-Seine
 J: Vernon
 K: Cormeilles-en-Parisis
 L: Les Mureaux
 M: Mantes-la-Jolie
 P: Paris Saint-Lazare
 T: Pontoise
 V: Vernon
 Y: Boissy-l'Aillerie

The second, third and fourth letters indicate the stations served by the train. Formerly, the second letter was used to designate the train type (I for express trains, A for semi-express trains, O for local trains), but this is no longer the case (but most all stops trains of Line J keep the O as the second letter). The third letter was also used to designate the route taken to the destination (for example C as a third letter indicates "via Conflans Sainte-Honorine"), but this is now abolished along with the second letter.

Line L

The trains on Line L travel between Gare Saint-Lazare in Paris and the west of Île-de-France region, with termini in Cergy, Versailles and L'Étang-la-Ville. The line has a total of 290,000 passengers per weekday.

List of Line L stations

Cergy Branch
Paris-Saint-Lazare
Pont-Cardinet station
Clichy–Levallois station
Asnières-sur-Seine station
Bécon-les-Bruyères station
Les Vallées station
La Garenne-Colombes station
Nanterre-Université station
Houilles–Carrières-sur-Seine station
Sartrouville station
Maisons-Laffitte station
Achères-Ville station
Conflans–Fin d'Oise station
Neuville-Université station
Cergy-Préfecture station
Cergy-Saint-Christophe station
Cergy-le-Haut station

Saint-Nom-la-Bretèche Branch
same route as the Cergy line between Paris-Saint-Lazare and Bécon-les-Bruyères
Courbevoie station
La Défense station
Puteaux station
Suresnes–Mont-Valérien station
Le Val d'Or station
Saint-Cloud station
Garches–Marnes-la-Coquette station
Vaucresson station
La Celle-Saint-Cloud station
Bougival station
Louveciennes station
Marly-le-Roi station
L'Étang-la-Ville station
Saint-Nom-la-Bretèche–Forêt de Marly station

Versailles Branch
same route as the Saint-Nom-la-Bretèche line between Paris-Saint-Lazare and Saint-Cloud
Sèvres–Ville-d'Avray station
Chaville-Rive-Droite station
Viroflay-Rive-Droite station
Montreuil station
Versailles-Rive Droite station

Services 
A four-letter code system is in use throughout Line L. These codes do not display on trains, but they are displayed on passenger information display systems.

The destination of the train is indicated by the first letter.

 B: Bécon-les-Bruyères
 D: Saint-Cloud
 F: Maisons-Laffitte
 N: Nanterre-Université
 P: Paris Saint-Lazare
 R: Marly-le-Roi
 S: Saint-Nom-la-Bretèche–Forêt de Marly
 U: Cergy-le-Haut
 V: Versailles-Rive Droite

The train type is indicated by the second letter.

 O: All stops
 A: Semi-express
 I: Limited stops
 U or E: Uses other stopping patterns

The route taken to the destination is indicated by the third letter.

 A: Asnières sur Seine
 B: Bécon-les-Bruyères
 C: Clichy–Levallois
 L: La Défense or Les Vallées
 M: Nanterre-Université
 P: Pont Cardinet

The fourth letter has no meaning, but it acts as a "padding" letter in order to make the code pronounceable.

See also
 List of Transilien stations

References

Transilien